The Berkut ("golden eagle") is a family of semi-automatic, gas-operated hunting carbines designed and manufactured by the KBP Instrument Design Bureau of Tula. The Berkut family of rifles is available in .308 Winchester, 7.62×54mmR, and, for larger game, 9×53mmR. The wooden stock is detachable for easy storage and is available in several different styles such as semi-pistol and thumb-hole.

Variants 
 Berkut-1 ("Беркут-1") – 7.62×39mm.
 К-93 ("Беркут-2" and "Беркут-2-1") – .308 Winchester.
 К-93-1 ("Беркут-2М") – 7.62×54mmR.
 Berkut-3 ("Беркут-3" and "Беркут-3-1") – 9×53mmR.
 Berkut-4 («Беркут-4»)

Users 

  - is allowed as civilian hunting weapon

References

Sources 
 Карабин самозарядный К-93-1. Паспорт К-93.00.000 ПС
 Беркут // А. И. Благовестов. То, из чего стреляют в СНГ / ред. А. Е. Тарас. Минск, «Харвест», М., ООО «Издательство АСТ», 2000. стр.561
 Виктор Рон. "Беркут" - птица хищная // журнал "Оружие", № 12, 2010. стр.63
 Алексей Блюм. Карабин в стиле "милитари" // журнал "Оружие", № 12, 2010. стр.64

External links
 KBP Main page
 Product page

7.62×54mmR semi-automatic rifles
7.62×51mm NATO semi-automatic rifles
7.62×39mm semi-automatic rifles
9×53mmR firearms
Rifles of Russia
Takedown guns
KBP Instrument Design Bureau products